The Catholic Church in Guinea is part of the worldwide Catholic Church, under the spiritual leadership of the pope.

There are approximately a quarter of a million Catholics - about 3% of the total population. There is one archdiocese (Conakry) and two dioceses (Kankan and N’Zérékoré).

References

External links
 Giga-Catholic Information
 Catholic Hierarchy

 
Guinea
Guinea